Mason Weare Tappan (October 20, 1817 – October 25, 1886) was a New Hampshire state representative, a U.S. congressman from 1855 to 1861, a colonel during the American Civil War and the New Hampshire Attorney General.

He was born in Newport, New Hampshire, and grew up in Bradford. He attended private schools and the Hopkinton and Meriden academies. He studied law and was admitted to the bar in 1841 and commenced practice in Bradford.

Tappan served in the New Hampshire House of Representatives 1853 to 1855. He was elected as an American Party candidate to the Thirty-fourth Congress and reelected as a Republican to the Thirty-fifth and Thirty-sixth congresses (March 4, 1855 – March 3, 1861). While in Congress, he served as chairman, Committee on Claims (Thirty-sixth Congress). He was not a candidate for renomination in 1860.

During the Civil War, he served as colonel of the 1st New Hampshire Infantry, a three-months regiment raised in 1861 in response to President Abraham Lincoln's call to arms. He mustered out in August 1861.

Tappan died in office as the New Hampshire Attorney General at the age of 69. He is buried in Pleasant Hill Cemetery, Bradford, New Hampshire.

References

1817 births
1886 deaths
People from Newport, New Hampshire
New Hampshire Attorneys General
New Hampshire Know Nothings
New Hampshire lawyers
Republican Party members of the New Hampshire House of Representatives
People of New Hampshire in the American Civil War
People from Bradford, New Hampshire
Union Army colonels
Know-Nothing members of the United States House of Representatives from New Hampshire
Republican Party members of the United States House of Representatives from New Hampshire
19th-century American politicians
19th-century American lawyers